Mount Nestor may refer to:

  Mount Nestor (Antarctica), a mountain in the Achaean Range of Antarctica
 Mount Nestor (Alberta), a mountain in Alberta, Canada